Paper or Plastic may refer to:

an expression referring to shopping bags
"Paper or Plastic" (CSI: Crime Scene Investigation), a 2004 episode
"Paper or Plastic" (song), 2016 song by Brooke Candy